Flight 523 may refer to:

ČSA Flight 523, crashed on 5 September 1967
Caribbean Airlines Flight 523 crashed on 30 July 2011

0523